Etzel Pass (el. 950 m.) is a mountain pass in the Alps in the canton of Schwyz in Switzerland.

It connects Pfäffikon and Einsiedeln. It lies on the route of pilgrimage to the abbey at Einsiedeln and on to Santiago de Compostela

See also
 List of highest paved roads in Europe
 List of mountain passes

References

Mountain passes of Switzerland
Mountain passes of the Alps
Mountain passes of the canton of Schwyz